Matula is a 1941 film by Tan Tjoei Hock.

Matula may also refer to any of the following:
 Matula (surname)
 Matula, uroscopy flask
Josef Matula, a character from the German television show Ein Fall für Zwei